Moray and Nairn was a county constituency of the House of Commons of the Parliament of the United Kingdom from 1918 to 1983.

It was formed by the amalgamation of the county constituency of Elginshire and Nairnshire with the parliamentary burghs of Elgin, previously part of Elgin Burghs, and Nairn and Forres, previously part of Inverness Burghs.

It was split for the 1983 general election and incorporated into Moray and Inverness, Nairn and Lochaber.

Members of Parliament

Election results

Elections in the 1910s

Elections in the 1920s

Elections in the 1930s

Elections in the 1940s

Elections in the 1950s

Elections in the 1960s

Elections in the 1970s

References 

 
 

Historic parliamentary constituencies in Scotland (Westminster)
Constituencies of the Parliament of the United Kingdom established in 1918
Constituencies of the Parliament of the United Kingdom disestablished in 1983
Highland constituencies, UK Parliament (historic)
Politics of Moray